Al-Hayrah is a sub-district located in Harf Sufyan District, 'Amran Governorate, Yemen. Al-Hayrah had a population of 3360 according to the 2004 census.

References 

Sub-districts in Harf Sufyan District